Mount Tilga, a hill located near  in the Central West region of New South Wales, Australia, was said to be the exact centre of New South Wales.

However, establishing the centre of an irregular shape is not a straightforward matter. Just where the centre of the State lies is open to dispute. This spot, south of the Fiveways Intersection, is marked by a cairn constructed for Australia's Bicentennial celebrations in 1988.

See also

 List of mountains of New South Wales

References 

Tilga
Central West (New South Wales)
Lachlan Shire